The 58th Rally Finland, the ninth rally of the 2008 World Rally Championship season took place between July 31 and August 3, 2008. The event was the first rally held after a six-week mid season break. The rally was based in the city of Jyväskylä in the centre of Finland with the special stages held on fast gravel roads in the lake district area of the country. The winner was the reigning world champion Sébastien Loeb, who became only the fourth non Scandinavian driver to win the event in fifty-eight runnings. It was his sixth win of the season and reduced the gap in the championship standings between himself and Finland's Mikko Hirvonen to just one point. Hirvonen finished in second, with Chris Atkinson taking the third podium spot for the Subaru World Rally Team. This would prove to be Subaru’s final podium in the world championship.

Event

Day one

The event started with a short superspecial stage on Thursday evening - which was won by Sébastien Loeb - before the first full day of action on Friday. The first stage on Friday demonstrated the competitive nature of the rally, with Loeb and Hirvonen setting identical times, and Jari-Matti Latvala only finishing three seconds behind them. However, Latvala was the first big casualty, hitting a rock on SS3 and damaging the suspension - an accident that put him out for the day and angered his Ford team boss Malcolm Wilson (rally). Meanwhile, Loeb was eking out a narrow advantage by winning every special stage until SS8. Hirvonen was also driving flat out and matched Loeb's time on SS6 and took his first outright stage win on the 7.86 mile test at Urria. At the end of day one, Loeb had built up a useful lead of 14.4 seconds, although Hirvonen had not given up hope. Behind the two leaders saw a three way battle between the two Stobart Ford drivers, Henning Solberg and Gigi Galli, and Loeb's teammate Dani Sordo. These three were covered by only twelve seconds. The two Subaru World Rally Team drivers, Petter Solberg and Chris Atkinson were having their own private battle, just over ninety seconds behind the leader. Suzuki's Per-Gunnar Andersson was in the final points paying position despite suffering a huge spin on SS2. Impressive performances were made by privateers Urmo Aava and Andreas Mikkelsen, with both featuring in the points earlier on day one - Aava was third after SS4 with Mikkelsen in fifth. However they both crashed out near the end of day one - Aava in SS9 and Mikkelsen in SS10.

Day two

The battle between Loeb and Hirvonen continued throughout day two with the pair regularly setting fastest times. They were opening up a big lead to the drivers behind them, with Hirvonen describing the pace as "crazy...how much longer can this go on for, I don't know." By the end of the day Loeb had pulled out another four seconds to take his lead to eighteen seconds. Most of this time was gained when Hirvonen stalled at the start of SS20.
Behind the leaders, Gigi Galli had been drawing away in the battle for third before an accident in the Kakaristo stage (which was a truncated and reversed version of Ouninpohja) put him out of the rally. After Galli, PG Andersson also rolled at the same corner. The main mover of the day was Subaru driver Chris Atkinson who leapt from seventh to third on the leaderboard by the end of day two. Dani Sordo was only a second behind in fourth but was having to be cautious in order to score manufacturer points. Henning Solberg was slipping back in fifth place while his brother Petter was one place behind in sixth. Privateer driver Matti Rantanen had moved up to seventh due to the retirements of others and Toni Gardemeister was keeping his Suzuki in the points despite having problems with his gearbox.

Day three

Results

Special stages 
All dates and times are EEST (UTC+3).

Championship standings after the event

Drivers' championship

Manufacturers' championship

References

External links 

 Results from the official site wrc.com

Finland
2008
Rally Finland, 2008